Marco Andreatta (born 9 January 1962) is an Italian bobsledder. He competed in the four man event at the 1992 Winter Olympics.

References

1962 births
Living people
Italian male bobsledders
Olympic bobsledders of Italy
Bobsledders at the 1992 Winter Olympics
Sportspeople from Brixen